The 2022–23 Scottish League One (known as cinch League One for sponsorship reasons) is the tenth season of Scottish League One, the third tier of Scottish football.

Ten teams contest the league: Airdrieonians, Alloa Athletic, Clyde, Dunfermline Athletic, Edinburgh, Falkirk, Kelty Hearts, Montrose, Peterhead and Queen of the South.

Teams
The following teams changed division after the 2021–22 season.

To League One
Promoted from League Two
 Edinburgh
 Kelty Hearts

Relegated from the Championship
 Dunfermline Athletic
 Queen of the South

From League One
Relegated to League Two
 East Fife
 Dumbarton

Promoted to the Championship
 Cove Rangers
 Queen's Park

Stadia and locations

Personnel and kits

Managerial changes

League summary

League table

Results

Matches 1–18
Teams play each other twice, once at home and once away.

Matches 19–36
Teams play each other twice, once at home and once away.

Season statistics

Scoring

Top scorers

Awards

References

External links
Official website

Scottish League One seasons
3
3
Scotland